German submarine U-188 was a Type IXC/40 U-boat of Nazi Germany's Kriegsmarine built for service during World War II.

Laid down on 18 August 1941 by Deutsche Schiff- und Maschinenbau AG (DeSchiMAG) of Bremen as yard number 1028, she was launched on 31 March 1942 and commissioned on 5 August under the command of Oberleutnant zur See Siegfried Lüdden.

The boat carried out three patrols and she was a member of three wolfpacks. She sank eight ships and one warship; she also damaged one ship.

She was scuttled at Bordeaux, France on 25 August 1944. The wreck was broken up in 1947.

Design
German Type IXC/40 submarines were slightly larger than the original Type IXCs. U-188 had a displacement of  when at the surface and  while submerged. She had two shafts and two  propellers.

U-188 was fitted with six  torpedo tubes (four fitted at the bow and two at the stern), 22 torpedoes, one  SK C/32 naval gun, 180 rounds, and a  SK C/30 as well as a  C/30 anti-aircraft gun. The boat had a complement of forty-eight.

Service history

First patrol
U-188 sailed from Kiel on 4 March 1943. She steamed through the gap between Iceland and the Faroe Islands, into the Northern Atlantic Ocean.

The boat's first victim was an old 'four stacker' destroyer,  in mid-Atlantic on 11 April. Less than a month later, the inbound submarine was attacked by an Armstrong-Whitworth Whitley of No. 612 Squadron RAF in the Bay of Biscay on 2 May. The Commander and one crewman were wounded. The crewman died in hospital in Paris on 12 May.

U-188 docked at Lorient in occupied France on 4 May.

Second patrol
Having left Lorient on 30 June 1943, U-188 headed for the Indian Ocean.

She was also successful when she damaged Britannia in the Gulf of Oman on 5 October. This ship was held together by wires and chains on the orders of the master who was known as the 'crazy Norwegian' by the British naval authorities in Bombay. The ship loaded 6,000 tons of oil in Abädän, Iran. She was eventually repaired in Baltimore in March 1944.

The boat crossed the Arabian Sea and the Bay of Bengal before docking at Penang in Malaya (now Malaysia) on 30 October.

Third patrol
U-188s third and final foray was her longest and most successful. Operating off the Horn of Africa, she sank seven ships in a 171-day patrol. Two of them, Fort la Maune and Samouri were sent to the bottom with no casualties. It was a different story concerning the fate of the Chinese registered Chung Cheng. Twenty men out of seventy-one were lost. The ship sank quickly, probably due to her cargo of 8,350 tons of ilmenite ore.

The boat returned to France, but to Bordeaux on 19 June 1944.

Fate
U-188 was scuttled in Bordeaux to prevent her being captured by the advancing Allies on 25 August 1944. The wreck was broken up in 1947.

Summary of raiding history

References

Notes

Citations

Bibliography

External links

German Type IX submarines
U-boats commissioned in 1942
U-boats scuttled in 1944
World War II submarines of Germany
1942 ships
Ships built in Bremen (state)
Monsoon Group
Indian Ocean U-Boats
Maritime incidents in August 1944